In rotordynamics, the rigid rotor is a mechanical model of rotating systems. An arbitrary rigid rotor is a 3-dimensional rigid object, such as a top. To orient such an object in space requires three angles, known as Euler angles. A special rigid rotor is the linear rotor requiring only two angles to describe, for example of a diatomic molecule. More general molecules are 3-dimensional, such as water (asymmetric rotor), ammonia (symmetric rotor), or methane (spherical rotor).

Linear rotor 
The linear rigid rotor model consists of two point masses located at fixed distances from their center of mass. The fixed distance between the two masses and the values of the masses are the only characteristics of the rigid model.  However, for many actual diatomics this model is too restrictive since distances are usually not completely fixed.  Corrections on the rigid model can be made to compensate for small variations in the distance. Even in such a case the rigid rotor model is a useful point of departure (zeroth-order model).

Classical linear rigid rotor 
The rotor is rigid if  is independent of time. The kinematics of a linear rigid rotor is usually described by means of spherical polar coordinates, which form a coordinate system of R3. In the physics convention the coordinates are the co-latitude (zenith) angle , the longitudinal (azimuth) angle  and the distance . The angles specify the orientation of the rotor in space. The kinetic energy  of the linear rigid rotor is given by

Scale factors are of importance for quantum mechanical applications since they enter the Laplacian expressed in curvilinear coordinates. In the case at hand (constant )

The classical Hamiltonian function of the linear rigid rotor is

Quantum mechanical linear rigid rotor 
The linear rigid rotor model can be used in quantum mechanics to predict the rotational energy of a diatomic molecule.  The rotational energy depends on the moment of inertia for the system, .  In the center of mass reference frame, the moment of inertia is equal to:

According to quantum mechanics, the energy levels  of a system can be determined by solving the Schrödinger equation:

For the rigid rotor in a field-free space, the energy operator corresponds to the kinetic energy of the system:

The Laplacian is given above in terms of spherical polar coordinates. The energy operator written in terms of these coordinates is:

This operator appears also in the Schrödinger equation of the hydrogen atom after the radial part is separated off. The eigenvalue equation becomes

The symbol  represents a set of functions known as the spherical harmonics. The energy 

is -fold degenerate: the functions with fixed  and  have the same energy.

Introducing the rotational constant , we write,

In the units of reciprocal length the rotational constant is,

with c the speed of light. The rotational constant  depends on the distance .

A typical rotational absorption spectrum consists of a series of peaks that correspond to transitions between levels with different values of the angular momentum quantum number such that , due to the selection rules (see below).

Selection rules 
Rotational transitions of a molecule occur when the molecule absorbs a photon [a particle of a quantized electromagnetic (em) field]. Depending on the energy of the photon (i.e., the wavelength of the em field) this transition may be seen as a sideband of a vibrational and/or 
electronic transition. Pure rotational transitions, in which the vibronic (= vibrational plus electronic) wave function does not change, occur in the microwave region of the electromagnetic spectrum.

This selection rule arises from a first-order perturbation theory approximation of the time-dependent Schrödinger equation. According to this treatment, rotational transitions can only be observed when one or more components of the dipole operator have a non-vanishing transition moment. If  is the direction of the electric field component of the incoming electromagnetic wave, the transition moment is,

A transition occurs if this integral is non-zero. By separating the rotational part of the molecular wavefunction from the vibronic part, one can show that this means that the molecule must have a permanent dipole moment. After integration over the vibronic coordinates the following rotational part of the transition moment remains,

Here  is the z component of the permanent dipole moment. The moment  is the vibronically averaged component of the dipole operator. Only the component of the permanent dipole along the axis of a heteronuclear molecule is non-vanishing.
This constraint results in the observed selection rules for the rigid rotor:

Non-rigid linear rotor 
The rigid rotor is commonly used to describe the rotational energy of diatomic molecules but it is not a completely accurate description of such molecules.  This is because molecular bonds (and therefore the interatomic distance ) are not completely fixed; the bond between the atoms stretches out as the molecule rotates faster (higher values of the rotational quantum number ).  This effect can be accounted for by introducing a correction factor known as the centrifugal distortion constant  (bars on top of various quantities indicate that these quantities are expressed in cm−1):

where

 is the fundamental vibrational frequency of the bond (in cm−1).  This frequency is related to the reduced mass and the force constant (bond strength) of the molecule according to 

The non-rigid rotor is an acceptably accurate model for diatomic molecules but is still somewhat imperfect.  This is because, although the model does account for bond stretching due to rotation, it ignores any bond stretching due to vibrational energy in the bond (anharmonicity in the potential).

Arbitrarily shaped rigid rotor 
An arbitrarily shaped rigid rotor is a rigid body of arbitrary shape with its center of mass fixed (or in uniform rectilinear motion) in field-free space R3, so that its energy consists only of rotational kinetic energy (and possibly constant translational energy that can be ignored).  A rigid body can be (partially) characterized by the three eigenvalues of its moment of inertia tensor, which are real nonnegative values known as principal moments of inertia.
In microwave spectroscopy—the spectroscopy based on rotational transitions—one usually classifies molecules (seen as rigid rotors) as follows:
 spherical rotors
 symmetric rotors
 oblate symmetric rotors
 prolate symmetric rotors
 asymmetric rotors
This classification depends on the relative magnitudes of the principal moments of inertia.

Coordinates of the rigid rotor 
Different branches of physics and engineering use different coordinates for the description of the kinematics of a rigid rotor. In molecular physics Euler angles are used almost exclusively. In quantum mechanical applications it is advantageous to use Euler angles in a convention that is a simple extension of the physical convention of spherical polar coordinates.

The first step is the attachment of a right-handed orthonormal frame (3-dimensional system of orthogonal axes) to the rotor (a body-fixed frame) . This frame can be attached arbitrarily to the body, but often one uses the principal axes frame—the normalized eigenvectors of the inertia tensor, which always can be chosen orthonormal, since the tensor is symmetric. When the rotor possesses a symmetry-axis, it usually coincides with one of the principal axes. It is convenient to choose
as body-fixed z-axis the highest-order symmetry axis.

One starts by aligning the body-fixed frame with a space-fixed frame (laboratory axes), so that the body-fixed x, y, and z axes coincide with the space-fixed X, Y, and Z axis. Secondly, the body and its frame are rotated actively over a positive angle  around the z-axis (by the right-hand rule), which moves the - to the -axis. Thirdly, one rotates the body and its frame over a positive angle  around the -axis. The z-axis of the body-fixed frame has after these two rotations the longitudinal angle  (commonly designated by ) and the colatitude angle  (commonly designated by ), both with respect to the space-fixed frame. If the rotor were cylindrical symmetric around its z-axis, like the linear rigid rotor, its orientation in space would be unambiguously specified at this point.

If the body lacks cylinder (axial) symmetry, a last rotation around its z-axis (which has polar coordinates  and ) is necessary to specify its orientation completely. Traditionally the last rotation angle is called .

The convention for Euler angles described here is known as the  convention; it can be shown (in the same manner as in this article) that it is equivalent to the  convention in which the order of rotations is reversed.

The total matrix of the three consecutive rotations is the product

Let  be the coordinate vector of an arbitrary point  in the body with respect to the body-fixed frame. Upon rotation of the body, the body-fixed coordinates of  do not change, but the space-fixed coordinate vector of  becomes,

In particular, if  is initially on the space-fixed Z-axis, it has the space-fixed coordinates

which shows the correspondence with the spherical polar coordinates (in the physical convention).

Knowledge of the Euler angles as function of time t and the initial coordinates  determine the kinematics of the rigid rotor.

Classical kinetic energy 
 The following text forms a generalization of the well-known special case of the rotational energy of an object that rotates around one axis.

It will be assumed from here on that the body-fixed frame is a principal axes frame; it diagonalizes the instantaneous inertia tensor  (expressed with respect to the space-fixed frame), i.e.,

This notation implies
that at  the Euler angles are zero, so that at  the body-fixed frame coincides with the space-fixed frame.

The classical kinetic energy T of the rigid rotor can be expressed in different ways:

 as a function of angular velocity
 in Lagrangian form
 as a function of angular momentum
 in Hamiltonian form.

Since each of these forms has its use and can be found in textbooks we will present all of them.

Angular velocity form 
As a function of angular velocity T reads,

with

The vector  on the left hand side contains the components of the angular velocity of the rotor expressed with respect to the body-fixed frame. The angular velocity satisfies equations of motion known as Euler's equations (with zero applied torque, since by assumption the rotor is in field-free space). It can be shown that  is not the time derivative of any vector, in contrast to the usual definition of velocity.

The dots over the time-dependent Euler angles on the right hand side indicate time derivatives. Note that a different rotation matrix would result from a different choice of Euler angle convention used.

Lagrange form 
Backsubstitution of the expression of  into T gives
the kinetic energy in Lagrange form (as a function of the time derivatives of the Euler angles). In matrix-vector notation,

where  is the metric tensor expressed in Euler angles—a non-orthogonal system of curvilinear coordinates—

Angular momentum form 
Often the kinetic energy is written as a function of the angular momentum  of the rigid rotor. With respect to the body-fixed frame it has the components , and can be shown to be related to the angular velocity,

This angular momentum is a conserved (time-independent) quantity if viewed from a stationary space-fixed frame. Since the body-fixed frame moves (depends on time) the components  are not time independent. If we were to represent  with respect to the stationary space-fixed frame, we would
find time independent expressions for its components.

The kinetic energy is expressed in terms of the angular momentum by

Hamilton form 
The Hamilton form of the kinetic energy is written in terms of generalized momenta

In Hamilton form the kinetic energy is,

with the inverse metric tensor given by

This inverse tensor is needed to obtain the Laplace-Beltrami operator, which (multiplied by ) gives the quantum mechanical energy operator of the rigid rotor.

The classical Hamiltonian given above can be rewritten to the following expression, which is needed in the phase integral arising in the classical statistical mechanics of rigid rotors,

Quantum mechanical rigid rotor 

As usual quantization is performed by the replacement of the generalized momenta by operators that give first derivatives with respect to its canonically conjugate variables (positions). Thus,

It is remarkable that this rule replaces the fairly complicated function  of all three Euler angles, time derivatives of Euler angles, and inertia moments (characterizing the rigid rotor) by a simple differential operator that does not depend on time or inertia moments and differentiates to one Euler angle only.

The quantization rule is sufficient to obtain the operators that correspond with the classical angular momenta. There are two kinds: space-fixed and body-fixed
angular momentum operators. Both are vector operators, i.e., both have three components that transform as vector components among themselves upon rotation of the space-fixed and the body-fixed frame, respectively. The explicit form of the rigid rotor angular momentum operators is given here (but beware, they must be multiplied with ). They satisfy anomalous commutation relations.

The quantization rule is not sufficient to obtain the kinetic energy operator from the classical Hamiltonian. After
quantization the commutation does no longer hold and the order of operators and functions in the Hamiltonian (energy operator) becomes a point of concern. Podolsky proposed in 1928 that the Laplace-Beltrami operator (times ) has the appropriate form for the quantum mechanical kinetic energy operator. This operator has the general form (summation convention: sum over repeated indices—in this case over the three Euler angles ):

where  is the determinant of the g-tensor:

Given the inverse of the metric tensor above, the explicit form of the kinetic energy operator in terms of Euler angles follows by simple substitution. (Note: The corresponding eigenvalue equation gives the Schrödinger equation for the rigid rotor in the form that it was solved for the first time by Kronig and Rabi (for the special case of the symmetric rotor). This is one of the few cases where the Schrödinger equation can be solved analytically. All these cases were solved within a year of the formulation of the Schrödinger equation.)

Nowadays it is common to proceed as follows. It can be shown that  can be expressed in body-fixed angular momentum operators (in this proof one must carefully commute differential operators with trigonometric functions). The result has the same appearance as the classical formula expressed in body-fixed coordinates,

In particular

It is a prolate (cigar shaped) top if . In the latter case we write the Hamiltonian as

and use that 

Hence

The eigenvalue  is -fold degenerate, for all eigenfunctions with  have the same eigenvalue.  The energies with |k| > 0 are -fold degenerate. This exact solution of the Schrödinger equation of the symmetric top was first found in 1927.

The asymmetric top problem is not soluble analytically, but it can be solved numerically.

Direct experimental observation of molecular rotations 
For a long time, molecular rotations could not be directly observed experimentally. Only measurement techniques with atomic resolution made it possible to detect the rotation of a single molecule. At low temperatures, the rotations of molecules (or part thereof) can be frozen. This could be directly visualized by Scanning tunneling microscopy i.e., the stabilization could be explained at higher temperatures by the rotational entropy.
The direct observation of rotational excitation at single molecule level was achieved recently using inelastic electron tunneling spectroscopy with the scanning tunneling microscope. The rotational excitation of molecular hydrogen and its isotopes were detected.

See also 
Balancing machine
Gyroscope
Infrared spectroscopy
Rigid body
Rotational spectroscopy
Spectroscopy
Vibrational spectroscopy
Quantum rotor model

References

General references 
  (Especially Section 2: The Rotation of Polyatomic Molecules).
 
 
  (Chapters 4 and 5)
  (Chapter 6).
 
 
 

Molecular physics
Rigid bodies
Rigid bodies mechanics
Rotation
Quantum models